Qaraməryəm (also, Karamar’yan and Yukhary Karamar’yan) is a village and municipality in the Goychay Rayon of Azerbaijan.  It has a population of 1,145.

References 

Populated places in Goychay District